ATA or Ata may refer to:

Computing
 AT Attachment (ATA/ATAPI), the old name of Parallel ATA, an older interface for computer storage devices
 Analog telephone adapter, a device for connecting analog telephones to a Voice-over-IP system

Education
 Ashcroft Technology Academy, Wandsworth, London, England
 Advanced Technologies Academy, a high school in Las Vegas, Nevada, USA
 Asia Theological Association
 Alberta Teachers' Association, Canada
 Automotive Technician Accreditation, scheme in the UK for vehicle mechanics

Science, technology, and medicine
 Anti-transglutaminase antibodies, in certain autoimmune diseases
 Anti-topoisomerase antibodies
 Anti-thyroglobulin antibodies
 Allen Telescope Array
 Atmosphere absolute, a variant of the standard atmosphere (unit)
 American Telemedicine Association
 American Thyroid Association
 ATA chapter numbers
 Alternating timed automaton
 ATA, a codon for the amino acid isoleucine

Sports
 American Taekwondo Association
 American Tennis Association
 Amateur Trapshooting Association
 Archery Trade Association
 A.T.A. (Greenland)

Organizations
 Africa Travel Association
 Air Transport Auxiliary
 Albanian Telegraphic Agency
 American Telugu Association
 American Topical Association, a philatelic organization
American Tinnitus Association
 American Translators Association
 Association of Talent Agents, Los Angeles, US
 Associazione Traffico e Ambiente, a transport association in Switzerland
 Atlantic Treaty Association
 Aberri Ta Askatasuna, the original name of the Basque organization ETA
 Artists' Television Access microcinema, San Francisco, US

Places
 Antarctica's ISO 3166-1 alpha-3 country code
 Áta, a village in Hungary
 Ața, a river in Romania
 ʻAta, Tonga, a depopulated island
 ʻAtā, Tonga, an island used as an open prison

Transportation
 ATA Airlines, an American airline operating from 1973 to 2008
 ATA Holdings, owner of ATA Airlines
 ATA Airlines (Iran), Tabriz
 ATA Cruiser, a 1920s aircraft
 Air Transport Association of America, later Airlines for America
 Air Transport Auxiliary of the UK RAF
 American Trucking Associations
 ATA Carnet, a customs document
 Comandante FAP Germán Arias Graziani Airport, Anta, Peru, IATA code
 Hall-Miller Municipal Airport, Atlanta, Cass County, Texas, US, FAA location identifier
 Station code for Alastua railway station

Other uses
 Ata (name), people with the first name or family name
 Ata language (disambiguation)
 Ata Gears, a transmission part producer
 Atacama skeleton, skeletal remains of a human that were found during 2003 in a deserted Chilean town

See also